Tornaghi is an Italian surname. Notable people with the surname include:

Alessia Tornaghi (born 2003), Italian figure skater
Enea Tornaghi (1830–after 1885), Italian painter
Paolo Tornaghi (born 1988), Italian footballer

Italian-language surnames